Coyhaique Province is one of four provinces of the southern Chilean region of Aisen (XI). Its capital city is Coyhaique. It is the most populous of provinces in the Aysén Region.

Administration
As a province, Coyhaique is a second-level administrative division of Chile, which is further sub-divided into two communes (comunas), Coyhaique and Lago Verde, each of which is governed by a municipality headed by an alcalde. The province is administered by a presidentially appointed governor. Néstor Mera Muñoz was appointed by president Sebastián Piñera.

Geography and demography
Of these, 44,850 (87.8%) lived in urban areas and 6,253 (12.2%) in rural areas. Between the 1992 and 2002 censuses, the population grew by 14.9% (6,638 persons).

Notes and references

Provinces of Aysén Region
Provinces of Chile